The Samoa News is a newspaper published in Pago Pago, American Samoa. In 1981, Samoa News was the major newspaper distributed in both of the Samoas. In January 1985, Lewis Wolman became editor of Samoa News. The Samoa News Ltd. was established in 1986, with Fuga Teleso as the majority shareholder. Wolman purchased Teleso's shares on November 18, 1986, and became the publisher-editor for Samoa News. It began printing on a web press in December 1989, allowing for an increase in paper size. In January 1990, it became the first daily newspaper in America Samoa, printed at its new facilities in the downtown Pago Pago location in Fagatogo. Fuga Tolani Teleso was chairman of the board.

Samoa News was also the name for the first private newspaper in American Samoa, which was published from April 1963–1966.

A partial microfilm archive of the paper is kept by the University of Washington.

References 

Newspapers published in American Samoa